Dmitri Shostakovich's String Quartet No. 13 in B-flat minor, Op. 138, was first conceived in 1969, and completed in 1970 as Shostakovich was undergoing treatment at the Russian Ilizarov Scientific Center for Restorative Traumatology and Orthopaedics in Kurgan.

The work consists of one movement:

Playing time is approximately 19 minutes.

The piece was dedicated to Vadim Borisovsky, violist of the Beethoven Quartet, and the viola is accordingly given a prominent role in the piece.  The quartet opens with a twelve-tone theme played on the viola, and concludes with a high B♭ held first by the viola, then with the violins in unison until reaching a sforzando.  The work also requires the players to tap on the bodies of their instruments with their bows at several points.

References

External links
 
   

13
1970 compositions
Compositions in B-flat minor